Manezhnaya Square (romanized Manezhnaya ploschad) is a square in the Tsentralny District of Saint Petersburg.

The shape of Manezhnaya Square is close to the right-angled triangle. Its longest cathetus, the southern side of Manezhnaya Square is formed with Italyanskaya Street, which runs parallel to Nevsky Prospect, at about hundred meters north of it. The shortest cathetus is Karavannaya Street, which forms the eastern side of the square running from Nevky prospect to the north. Another street connecting the square to Nevsky is Malaya Sadovaya which intersects Italyanskaya Street at the western corner of the square. Here converges the third, longest side — the "hypotenuse" of this triangle square. Driveways flanking one of the buildings on this side of the square merge behind it into a boulevard, Klenovaya alley, which runs from Manezhnaya Square to Mikhailovsky Castle.

Walkmap

Literature

References

Tourist attractions in Saint Petersburg